Ulukbek Zholdoshbekov (born 9 February 1996) is a Kyrgyzstani freestyle wrestler. He won the gold medal in the 61 kg event at the 2020 Asian Wrestling Championships held in New Delhi, India.

Career 

At the 2016 Asian Wrestling Championships held in Bangkok, Thailand, he won one of the bronze medals in the men's 57 kg event. In the same year, he also competed in the first qualification tournament hoping to qualify for the 2016 Summer Olympics in Rio de Janeiro, Brazil. His efforts were unsuccessful as he was eliminated in his third match in the tournament, against Sandeep Tomar of India. In that same year, he won one of the bronze medals in the men's 57 kg event at the 2016 World University Wrestling Championships held in Çorum, Turkey.

In 2017, he was eliminated in his first match in the 57 kg event at the World Wrestling Championships held in Paris, France. A month later, he was eliminated in his second match in the men's 57 kg event at the Asian Indoor and Martial Arts Games held in Ashgabat, Turkmenistan.

In 2019, he won the gold medal in the 61 kg event at the Asian U23 Wrestling Championship held in Ulaanbaatar, Mongolia. He also won the gold medal in the 61 kg event at the 2019 World U23 Wrestling Championship in Budapest, Hungary. In the same year, he also competed in the men's freestyle 57 kg event at the 2019 World Wrestling Championships in Nur-Sultan, Kazakhstan where he was eliminated in his first match by Mahir Amiraslanov of Azerbaijan.

In 2022, he won one of the bronze medals in his event at the Yasar Dogu Tournament held in Istanbul, Turkey. He competed in the 61kg event at the 2022 World Wrestling Championships held in Belgrade, Serbia.

Achievements

References

External links 
 

Living people
1996 births
Kyrgyzstani male sport wrestlers
Asian Wrestling Championships medalists
20th-century Kyrgyzstani people
21st-century Kyrgyzstani people